Andrea Accardi (born 30 July 1995) is an Italian football player, currently playing for  club Piacenza.

Club career
He made his Serie B debut for Trapani on 24 October 2015 in a game against Cagliari.

Following Palermo's exclusion from the Serie B, he was released together with all other players. Following Palermo's refoundation in August 2019 as a phoenix club and its admission to Serie D, he was re-signed by the Rosanero, thus becoming the only player from the past season's Serie B campaign who agreed to stay at the club.

On 3 January 2023, after making no appearances in the first half of the 2022–23 Serie B campaign with the Rosanero, Accardi left Palermo to join Serie C club Piacenza on a permanent transfer until the end of the season.

Career statistics

Club

References

External links
 

1995 births
Footballers from Palermo
Living people
Italian footballers
Palermo F.C. players
Trapani Calcio players
Modena F.C. players
Piacenza Calcio 1919 players
Serie B players
Serie C players
Serie D players
Association football defenders